The Valley Timberwolves are a Canadian junior ice hockey team from Renfrew, Ontario.  They played in the Eastern Ontario Junior Hockey League until the league was re-branded the Central Canada Hockey League Tier 2 (CCHL2) 2015.

History
The Renfrew Jr. B Timberwolves came into existence in 1968 as the Renfrew Lions, sponsored by The Renfrew Lions Club and captured their first Eastern Ontario Championship that year.

In the early 1970s, Renfrew's Junior team became the Timberwolves and the team has since captured 4 other Eastern Ontario Titles; 1977, 1988, 1990 and 1993. 

Banners on the wall at Ma-Te-Way Arena also include 8 Valley Division Titles and 4 Boxing Day Tournament Titles which all attest to the success that the team has enjoyed over the years. Not only has the team been successful as a community group, but many individual players have gone on to University, Semi-pro, or Professional Teams.

The franchise is one of 22 teams in the Eastern Ontario Junior Hockey League, and is one of six teams in the Valley Division. The league is divided into two conferences and four divisions; The Metro-Valley and the Rideau-St. Lawrence. Up until the 2009-2010 all six teams in the Valley Division advanced to the playoffs, now only the top 4 teams continue beyond the regular season and the quality of hockey has continued to improve and player development remains an important part of Jr. B Hockey. The league introduced a showcase weekend known as the Fall Classic which has replaced the Boxing Day Tournament.

Season-by-season results

See also

 Renfrew Creamery Kings

External links
Timberwolves Webpage
CCHL2 Webpage

Eastern Ontario Junior B Hockey League teams
Ice hockey clubs established in 1987
1987 establishments in Ontario